Lukáš Přinda (born 1980) is a Czech slalom canoeist who competed at the international level from 1995 to 2012.

He won a silver medal in the C2 team event at the 2010 ICF Canoe Slalom World Championships in Tacen. He also won two gold medals in the same event at the European Championships.

His partner in the C2 boat from 2010 to 2012 was Jan Havlíček.

References

 2010 ICF Canoe Slalom World Championships 11 September 2010 C-2 men's team final results. - accessed 11 September 2010.

Czech male canoeists
Living people
1980 births
Medalists at the ICF Canoe Slalom World Championships